Pentti Paatsalo (21 August 1932 – 28 May 1996) was a Finnish freestyle swimmer. He competed in two events at the 1952 Summer Olympics.

References

External links
 

1932 births
1996 deaths
Finnish male freestyle swimmers
Olympic swimmers of Finland
Swimmers at the 1952 Summer Olympics
People from Kemi
Sportspeople from Lapland (Finland)